The German football champions are the annual winners of the highest association football competition in Germany.

History
The history of the German football championship is complex and reflects the turbulent history of the country through the course of the 20th century.

Brought to the country by English expatriates, the sport took root in the cities of Berlin, Hamburg, Stuttgart, and Leipzig in the 1890s, leading to the growth of city, regional, and academic leagues, each with their own championships. Following the establishment of the German Football Association (Deutscher Fußball Bund) in 1900, the first recognized national championship match was hosted by Hamburg club Altona 93 in 1903 in which VfB Leipzig defeated DFC Prag 7–2, and was awarded the Viktoria, the championship trophy from 1903 to 1944. Before the formation of the Bundesliga in 1963, the championship format was based on a knockout competition, contested between the winners of each of the country's top regional leagues. Since 1963, the first-place finisher in the Bundesliga has been recognized as the national champion.

Championship play was suspended twice; from 1915 to 1919 due to World War I and again from 1945 to 1947 due to World War II. Following World War II, Germany was occupied by the victorious Allies and two German football competitions emerged when the country was divided as a result. The historical tradition of the DFB was continued in what was known as West Germany, while a second national championship was contested in Soviet-controlled East Germany under the auspices of the DFV (Deutscher Fußball-Verband or German Football Federation). Following the reunification of the country in 1990, the two separate football competitions were merged and a single national championship was restored.

Bayern Munich hold the record for the most championships with 32, all but one of these (1932) coming in Bundesliga competition. BFC Dynamo claimed 10 titles in the former East Germany, winning these championships in consecutive seasons (1979–88).

Champions

Early German football championships (1903–32)
The new English game of football quickly caught on in late 19th-century Germany, which had previously been a nation of gymnasts. The earliest attempt at organizing some form of national championship came in 1894, when city champions Viktoria 89 Berlin invited FC Hanau 93 to play a challenge match. The Hanauers were unable to afford the cost of the trip and so were unable to take up the invitation. In 2007, the 1894 final was replayed and Viktoria were crowned the official 1894 champions.

After its formation in 1900, the DFB began to establish its authority over the myriad city and regional leagues springing up throughout the country and organized the first officially recognized national championship in 1903.

The prize of German football was the Viktoria, a trophy statue of a seated Roman goddess of victory, donated by the committee that organized German participation in the 1900 Olympic Games in Paris – and originally intended to be shared with teams playing the rugby version of football. The formation of the DFB helped establish for the first time a clear divide between association football and its close cousin.

To qualify for the German championship finals, a club had to win one of the regional championships, which, in some cases, predate the national one. Those were:
 Southern German football championship – formed in 1898
 Brandenburg football championship – formed in 1898
 Central German football championship – formed in 1902
 Western German football championship – formed in 1903
 Northern German football championship – formed in 1906
 South Eastern German football championship – formed in 1906
 Baltic football championship – formed in 1908

One other regional championships briefly existed:
 March football championship – existed from 1903 to 1911

From 1925 onwards, the runners-up of those competitions were also qualified for the German championship finals, which had been expanded to sixteen clubs. The two strongest regions, South and West were also allowed to send their third-placed team. This system of regional championships was abolished in 1933 and superseded by the Gauliga system.

German football championships in Nazi Germany (1933–45)

With the beginning of the 1933–34 season, top-flight German football was reorganized into 16 regional Gauligen with each of these leagues sending their champion to the national playoffs. New Gauligen were created as the Reich expanded its border through the Anschluss with Austria. This expanded the national championship competition with the addition of regional champions from the new circuits. It also introduced previously foreign clubs into German domestic competition where Viennese Austrian sides made a notable impression. Competition during the war was also characterized by the formation of military-based clubs including the Luftwaffe side LSV Hamburg which appeared in the era's last national championship match at the end of the 1943–44 season. Unlike the United Kingdom, where play was suspended early on, national football competition continued on in Germany in some form through the course of the war. Play finally collapsed as the war drew to its conclusion and no champion was declared in 1944–45.

It was also during this period that a national cup competition was introduced; the Tschammerpokal was named for Reichssportführer (Sports Chief of the Reich) Hans von Tschammer und Osten and is predecessor to the modern-day DFB-Pokal (German Cup). The first cup competition was staged in 1935 and won by 1. FC Nürnberg.

Key

German football championships from post-war to the Bundesliga (1946–63)
In the immediate aftermath of World War II, German football was in complete disarray. Occupying Allied authorities ordered the dissolution of most organizations in the country.

However, many football clubs were soon re-established and new sides formed; play was tentatively resumed. By 1948, a new first division league structure, the Oberligen, was in place in most of the Western zone of occupation. The restored competition maintained the German game's historical practice of play in regional leagues. An exception was in French-occupied Saarland where attempts by France to annex the state were manifested in the formation of a separate, but short-lived, football competition that staged its own championship. Saarland briefly had its own representation under FIFA, forming Olympic and World Cup sides, before re-joining German competition in 1956.

In the Soviet-occupied East zone, a more enduring separation took place that was not mended until the reunification of Germany in 1990. As a result, Eastern-based clubs did not take part in the German national championship under the DFB, vying instead for a different prize. The country's capital city of Berlin was similarly divided and clubs based in West Berlin took part in western-based competition.

The Viktoria disappeared at war's end, although it would eventually reappear and be held in East Germany. A new trophy – the Meisterschale – was introduced in the west in 1949. The first post-war champions were 1. FC Nürnberg (2–1 over 1. FC Kaiserslautern in Köln) who were also, coincidentally, the first champions following World War I.

Over time, the notion of professionalism – long anathema to German sports – made inroads in the country. A consequence of this was that by 1956, a distinct national amateur championship was established, open to teams playing below the Oberliga level in second- and third tier leagues.

East German football championships (1950–90)

The post-war occupation of Germany by the victorious Allies eventually led to the de facto partition of the country and the emergence of two separate German states, each with its own government and institutions.

Early plans to maintain a national championship to be contested by representatives from the eastern and western halves of the country quickly fell by the wayside in the context of the Cold War. An Ostzone champion was declared in each of the 1946–48 seasons and in 1949 the first division DDR-Oberliga was established under the DFV (Deutscher Fußball-Verband der DDR) as a distinct national sport governing body. From 1950 through to 1990 an East German football champion was declared, until the eastern competition was reintegrated into the German national competition under the DFB.

In the first recognized East German national championship staged in 1949, ZSG Union Halle defeated SG Fortuna Erfurt 4–1. In 1990, the last East German champion was SG Dynamo Dresden. The following season the DDR-Oberliga (I) was redesignated the Nord-Ostdeutscher Fußball Verband Oberliga and became a third tier regional division within the existing German league structure under the DFB. FC Hansa Rostock captured the title in the transitional 1990–91 season, and alongside runners-up SG Dynamo Dresden, advanced to play in the Bundesliga, thereby fully integrating former Eastern clubs into a unified German championship.

Bundesliga (since 1963)
The formation of the Bundesliga in 1963 marked a significant change to the German football championship. The historical regional league and national playoff format was abandoned in favour of a single unified national league. Sixteen teams from the five Oberligen in place at the time were invited to be part of the new circuit – which also for the first time formally acknowledged the sport as professional rather than amateur.

The new league adopted a round-robin format in which each team plays every other club once at home and once away. There is no playoff, with the club having the best record at the end of the season claiming the German championship. 1. FC Köln captured the first-ever Bundesliga title in the league's inaugural 1963–64 season. Since then the competition has been dominated by Bayern Munich which has taken the championship in 31 of the 59 Bundesliga seasons played to 2022.

Key

Performances
Over the history of the German football championship, 29 different clubs have won the title. The most successful club is FC Bayern Munich, with 32 titles to its credit, 31 of those coming in Bundesliga competition. The most successful pre-Bundesliga club is 1. FC Nürnberg, who won eight titles in the era of knockout play amongst regional champions.

Former German champions are recognized through the Verdiente Meistervereine system which permits the display of a star or stars on a club's jersey. This system allows for the recognition of both German and East German titles, although only German titles are listed in the table below.

Clubs in bold currently play in the top division.

Performance by club

Notes:
A.  VfB Leipzig would have faced Berliner TuFC, but no final was held.
B.  The German football championship was not held from 1915 to 1919 due to the First World War.
C.  The 1922 final between Hamburger SV and 1. FC Nürnberg ended 2–2. The match was called due to darkness after 189 minutes of play. The replay ended 1–1 when the referee called off the game while in extra time due to Nuremberg having just seven players remaining in the game. Hamburg was awarded the championship but later declined.
D.  The German football championship was not held from 1945 to 1947 due to the Second World War and its aftermath.
E.  VfB Leipzig are now known as Lokomotive Leipzig.
F.  Vienna was part of Germany when Rapid Wien won the championship in 1941.

Performance by state and regional association
As of 2022, German football champions have come from 11 of the 16 German states. The most successful state is Bavaria with 45 championships. Bavaria is also home to the two individually most successful clubs, Bayern Munich and 1. FC Nürnberg. North Rhine-Westphalia follows with 25 championships. The state is home to the third and fourth most successful clubs, Borussia Dortmund and Schalke 04. No club from the Saarland, Thuringia, Saxony-Anhalt, Brandenburg, and Mecklenburg-Vorpommern has yet won the championship.

In most cases the regional associations of the DFB align with state borders in Germany. However, the DFB has two regional associations in Rhineland-Palatinate, and three each in North Rhine-Westphalia and Baden-Württemberg. For the champions of these states the regional associations are mentioned as well. From 1938 to 1945 Austria was part of Germany, and Austrian clubs were thus allowed to compete in the German football championship. Rapid Wien won one championship in that period.

Undeclared championships
In over a century of German football competition, champions were not declared in several seasons for various reasons. No champion was declared in 1904 due to the DFB's inability to resolve a protest filed by Karlsruher FV over their 1–6 semi-final loss to Britannia Berlin to determine which of these sides would face defending champion Leipzig in that year's final. Karlsruhe's protest was over the failure to play the match at neutral venue.

The national championship was suspended in October 1915 due to World War I. Limited play continued on a regional basis in many parts of the country, while competition was abandoned in other areas. Several regional leagues continued to declare champions or cup winners. The national championship was reinstated with the 1919–20 season that was concluded with a 2–0 victory by 1. FC Nürnberg over SpVgg Fürth in Frankfurt.

The 1922 final was contested by 1. FC Nürnberg and Hamburger SV, but never reached a conclusion on the pitch. The match was called on account of darkness after three hours and ten minutes of play, drawn at 2–2. The re-match also went into extra time, and in an era that did not allow for substitutions, the game was called at 1–1 when Nürnberg was reduced to just seven players and the referee ruled they could not continue. Considerable wrangling ensued over the decision. The DFB awarded the win to Hamburg under the condition that they renounce the title in the name of "good sportsmanship" – which they grudgingly did. Ultimately, the championship trophy was not officially presented that year.

Competition for the national title was maintained through most of World War II and was supported by the regime for morale. Play became increasingly difficult as the war drew to its conclusion due to manpower shortages, bombed-out stadiums, and the hardship and expense of travel. In the era's final championship match Dresdner SC beat the military club LSV Hamburg 4–0 on 18 June 1944 in Berlin's Olympiastadion. The 1944–45 season kicked off ahead of schedule in November; however, by March 1945 play had collapsed throughout Germany as Allied armies overran the country. Play was tentatively resumed in various parts of the now-occupied country in early 1946 and the postwar Oberliga structure began to take shape in the 1946–47 season; no national champion was declared from 1945 to 1947. In 1947–48, qualification play took place to determine Westzonen (Western occupation zones) and Ostzone (Eastern occupation zone) representatives to meet in a national final that never took place. 1. FC Nürnberg is recognized as the first postwar German national champion for its 2–1 victory over 1. FC Kaiserslautern in the Westzonen final staged on 8 August 1948 in Mannheim. In the Ostzone, SG Planitz beat SG Freiimfelde Halle 1–0 on 4 July 1948 in Leipzig to qualify for the scheduled national final, but were denied a permit to travel to play the match by Soviet authorities.

Other national championships

Workers' and Faith-based Leagues
In the aftermath of World War I, several lesser national football competitions emerged as outgrowths of the tumultuous German political situation. These included the left-leaning workers' ATSB (Arbeiter-Turn- und Sport-Bund), the Catholic-sponsored DJK (Deutschen Jugendkraft), the Protestant-backed DT (Deutsche Turnerschaft), and the Communist KG (Kampfgemeinschaft für Rote Sporteinheit). Through the 1920s and 1930s, each of these leagues staged their own national championships or fielded national sides. Because of the ideologies they represented, they were considered politically unpalatable by the regime and disappeared in the 1933 reorganization of German football under Nazi Germany that consolidated competition in state-sanctioned leagues. These clubs were forced into mergers with other mainstream sides or saw their assets seized by the state.

Anti-semitism in Germany led to the creation of Jewish sports associations as Jews were forced out of mainstream clubs. These associations, including Sportbund Schild and Makkabi, staged their own national championships from 1933-38.

Arbeiter-Turn- und Sportbund (1920–1933)
Key

Deutsche Jugendkraft (1921–1932)

Deutsche Turnerschaft (1925–1930)

Following the 1930 season, most DT teams became part of the mainstream DFB.

Kampfgemeinschaft für Rote Sporteinheit (1931–1933)

Participation of non-German clubs
German championships have included clubs from countries other than Germany. DFC Prag, vice-champions in the first national final and a founding member of the DFB, was an ethnically-German club from Bohemia in the Austro-Hungarian Empire (today part of the Czech Republic) which did not at the time have its own national football federation.

Following the annexation of Austria, which was incorporated into Nazi Germany in 1938, Austrian clubs became part of German competition; Admira Wien made a losing appearance in the German national final in 1939, Rapid Wien captured the championship in 1941, and First Vienna also lost in 1942. In each case their opposition was Schalke 04. Throughout the course of World War II, clubs in German-occupied territories were made part of German competition in the Gauligen and took part in the regional qualifying rounds of the national championship, but without the same success as Austrian sides.

Trophies
 
Two trophies have been used for the official German and, during the era of the divided Germany, West German champions. The pre-Second World War trophy, the Viktoria, was awarded from 1903 to 1944, making Saxonian clubs VfB Leipzig the first and Dresdner SC the last club to receive it. The trophy disappeared during the final stages of the war and would not resurface until after the German reunification. A new trophy, the Meisterschale, was commissioned after the war but was not ready for the first post-war champions in 1948. Instead it was first awarded to VfR Mannheim in 1949. While the original trophy has only the champions from 1903 to 1944 engraved the new one lists all the German champions since 1903 and has had to be enlarged on occasion.

See also
 List of East German football champions
 Southern German football championship
 List of German women's football champions
 List of Bundesliga top scorers

References

Bibliography

 

Football competitions in Germany
Germany